When Eagles Strike (released in the Philippines as Operation Balikatan) is a 2003 war action film co-produced and directed by Cirio H. Santiago. The film stars ex-bodybuilder Christian Boeving, Stacy Keach, Davee Youngblood, Nate Adams, Eddie Garcia, Rey Malonzo, and Monsour del Rosario.

The film received mostly negative reviews, and the response for Boeving's portrayal of a classically written action hero has been mixed.

Plot
A group of American commandos go on a mission to save American politicians who were kidnapped and held on a forgotten Malaysian island. Tough-guy lieutenant Andrew Pierce commands the group. During the mission it's revealed there's a traitor in the ranks of the team. Consequently, American soldiers are betrayed and captured by the opponents, who then interrogate and brutally torture Pierce.

Cast
 Christian Boeving as Lieutenant Andrew Pierce
 Stacy Keach as General Thurmond
 Davee Youngblood as Private First Class Tyler Owens
 Jesse Vint as Captain Spencer
 Rey Malonzo as Lieutenant Rodrigo Gomez
 Nate Adams as Darren, the military medic
 Eddie Garcia as General Espino
 Jess Lapid Jr. as Salek
 Monsour del Rosario as Ahmed
 Joe Mari Avellana as Ibrahim, a leader of Al-Qaeda

Production and release

The film was shot in the Philippines (including Manila and Subic Bay) early in 2003, with shoots starting on February 4. American as well as Filipino actors were cast in the film, with ex-bodybuilder Christian Boeving taking the lead. Boeving makes his own stunts during the filming, and he stated in the interview for AHF Magazine: "I get my ass severely kicked in the movie, which is something I'm sure a lot of people would like to do to me."

Oscar-winner Jack Palance was supposed to appear in the movie but is not seen in its final version.

When Eagles Strike was released on June 11, 2003 in the Philippines. Then the project was released directly-to-DVD in such countries as Russia (under the title Когда орел атакует), Brasil (as O Ataque dos Águias; the film was tagged as based on a true story), and Japan (as Codename Eagle). In April 2004 the film was released on DVD in the United States. The movie was released as Black Hawk Down sequel in Taiwan.

Reception
The film received mixed to generally negative critical reception, currently holding 33% fresh on Rotten Tomatoes. Scott Weinberg from eFilmCritic.com concluded: "One might be tempted to classify this movie as 'ripped from the headlines' when in fact 'ripped from the trash heap' would be an infinitely more accurate assessment. (...) If (...) you're looking for a solid war movie, just keep on walkin'." Weinberg called his review of When Eagles Strike "Where's John Rambo when we need him?", and awarded the film one star out of four. MonsterHunter believed that characters in the movie are "noisily dull," and named Christian Boeving's lead "Uncle Sam on steroids," saying that "his massive arms are the only real development his character has."

An editor of Actionfreunde called Boeving "a walking muscle", a man "as charismatic as a slowly drying wallpaper piece." In The German Lexicon of International Films it is stated that When Eagles Strike is a clichéd, stereotypical action movie riddled with references to the September 11 attacks. A reviewer from action cinema-related website Yippee-ki-yay, Motherf*cker! believed that the movie lacked the element of surprise but praised Boeving as its sole positive aspect. "Boeving is refreshing as a macho-type commando. (...) He's a resurrected 80s action movie hero—dripping sweat, super handsome, running through the jungles in a tight undershirt." Prime News listed "When Eagles Strike" among the greatest war movies of all time (it received an honorable mention).

Sequel
A sequel, When Eagles Strike 2 − Mission: Survive, was written, and was supposed to have been filmed in 2004 as a television film, but the project was canceled. Lieutenant Andrew Pierce was the main character once again.

References

External links
 
 

2003 action films
2003 direct-to-video films
2003 films
American action war films
Cultural depictions of bodybuilders
Films about the United States Marine Corps
American war adventure films
Films shot in the Philippines
Films set in Malaysia
Premiere Productions films
Films directed by Cirio H. Santiago
2000s American films